The 2019 WPA Players Championship was a 9-Ball pool international event held in Las Vegas, Nevada. The event was organized jointly by the World Pool-Billiard Association (WPA) and CueSports International (CI). The event was played with  rules, from a field of 64, with players qualifying from tours such as the WPA and European Pocket Billiard Federation.

Tournament format
The event consisted of a field of 64 players, with qualification spots given to players in the following ratio:

Matches were played with a shot clock, and under  rules.

Prize fund 
The event had a prize fund of $66,000, with prize money being paid out of the players entrance fees, plus $50,000.

References

External links

2019 in cue sports
Pool competitions
WPA Players
Sports competitions in Las Vegas
International sports competitions hosted by the United States
WPA Players Championship
WPA Players Championship